"Rebels" is a song by Tom Petty and the Heartbreakers. It appeared on the 1985 album Southern Accents and was released as a single in the same year.  Although it only reached #74 on the Billboard Hot 100 pop chart, it fared much better on the Billboard Album Rock Tracks chart, where it peaked at #5.

"Rebels" and Petty's broken hand
The track was recorded in 1984. It was during the recording of this track that Petty broke his hand. Petty remembers being so high on drugs that he could not get an arrangement he liked. Petty went into the control room, and put the original demo tape on, which featured just him and a Rickenbacker 12-string guitar. He believed that they had yet to record an arrangement better than this demo, which made him so furious that he stormed up the stairs into his house, and punched the wall, causing severe damage to his left hand. After taking time off for his hand to heal, Petty called Jimmy Iovine in to help him finish "Rebels" along with some other tracks on Southern Accents. Alan "Bugs" Weidel, Tom's roadie, considers "Rebels" a least favorite of his due to Petty's broken hand.

Reception
Cash Box said that it's "another strong outing from Petty And The Heartbreakers" and highlighted "Petty’s urgent vocal and lyrics of alienation."

Personnel
Tom Petty & the Heartbreakers
Tom Petty – 12-string guitar, lead vocals
Mike Campbell – guitars, bass, keyboards
Benmont Tench – keyboards, backing vocals
Stan Lynch – drums, backing vocals
Howie Epstein – backing vocals

Additional musicians
William Bergman – horn, tenor saxophone, backing vocals
John Berry Jr. – trumpet, horn
Dick Braun – trumpet, horn, backing vocals
Jim Coile – horn, tenor saxophone, backing vocals
Kurt McGettrick – horn, backing vocals
Molly Duncan – saxophone
Dave Plews – trumpet
Bobbye Hall – percussion

Cover versions
The Drive-By Truckers released a cover version of Rebels on their compilation The Fine Print: A Collection of Oddities and Rarities in 2009.

Charts

References

1985 singles
Tom Petty songs
Songs written by Tom Petty
1985 songs
MCA Records singles